The Women's team sprint was held on 15 October 2015.

Results

Qualifying
The fastest 4 teams qualify for the medal finals.

 QG = qualified for gold medal final
 QB = qualified for bronze medal final

Finals
The final classification is determined in the medal finals.

References

Women's team sprint
European Track Championships – Women's team sprint